Rhysodromus is a genus of spiders in the family Philodromidae. It was first described in 1965 by Schick. , it contains 28 species.

Species
Rhysodromus comprises the following species:
Rhysodromus ablegminus (Szita & Logunov, 2008) – Kazakhstan
Rhysodromus alascensis (Keyserling, 1884) – North America, Russia (Urals to Far East), Kazakhstan, China
Rhysodromus angulobulbis (Szita & Logunov, 2008) – Russia (South Siberia)
Rhysodromus caspius (Ponomarev, 2008) – Kazakhstan
Rhysodromus cinerascens (O. Pickard-Cambridge, 1885) – India, China (Yarkand)?
Rhysodromus fallax (Sundevall, 1833) –  Europe, North Africa, Turkey, Caucasus, Russia (Europe to Far East), Kazakhstan, Iran, Central Asia, Mongolia, China
Rhysodromus genoensis (Zamani & Marusik, 2021) – Iran
Rhysodromus halophilus (Levy, 1977) – Israel
Rhysodromus hierosolymitanus (Levy, 1977) – Israel, United Arab Emirates, Iran
Rhysodromus hierroensis (Wunderlich, 1992) – Canary Is.
Rhysodromus histrio (Latreille, 1819) – North America, Europe, Turkey, Caucasus, Russia (Europe to Far East), Central Asia, China
Rhysodromus hui (Yang & Mao, 2002) – China
Rhysodromus lanchowensis (Schenkel, 1936) – Russia (West Siberia to Far East), China, Korea, Japan 
Rhysodromus lepidus (Blackwall, 1870) – Mediterranean to India
Rhysodromus leucomarginatus (Paik, 1979) – China, Korea
Rhysodromus medes (Zamani & Marusik, 2021) – Iran
Rhysodromus mysticus (Dondale & Redner, 1975) – Russia (Middle Siberia to Far East), USA, Canada
Rhysodromus naxcivanicus (Logunov & Huseynov, 2008) – Azerbaijan
Rhysodromus petrobius (Schmidt & Krause, 1995) – Cape Verde Is.
Rhysodromus pictus (Kroneberg, 1875) – Central Asia to China
Rhysodromus rikhteri (Logunov & Huseynov, 2008) – Armenia, Azerbaijan
Rhysodromus signatus (O. Pickard-Cambridge, 1870) – St. Helena
Rhysodromus sinaiticus (Levy, 1977) – Egypt
Rhysodromus timidus (Szita & Logunov, 2008) – Russia (Caucasus), Kazakhstan, Pakistan
Rhysodromus triangulatus (Urita & Song, 1987) – Kazakhstan to China
Rhysodromus tuvinensis (Szita & Logunov, 2008) – Russia (West and South Siberia), Kazakhstan, Mongolia
Rhysodromus xerophilus (Szita & Logunov, 2008) – Russia (Central Asia, South Siberia), Kazakhstan
Rhysodromus xinjiangensis (Tang & Song, 1987) – Azerbaijan, Kazakhstan, Central Asia, China

References

Philodromidae
Araneomorphae genera
Spiders of Asia
Spiders of North America